Ding Jilian (born 5 August 1963) is a Chinese former swimmer who competed in the 1984 Summer Olympics held in Los Angeles, CA. At the age of 20, Ding competed in the 100 meter freestyle, and the 4 × 100 meter medley races. Ding's rank for the 100 meter freestyle was 22nd, and the Chinese team came ninth in the medley relay.

Ding was 5'5 and weighed 132 lbs at the time of competition.

References

1963 births
Living people
Chinese female freestyle swimmers
Olympic swimmers of China
Swimmers at the 1984 Summer Olympics